Ocotea oocarpa is a species of plant in the family Lauraceae. It is an evergreen tree in the genus Ocotea. It is endemic to Ecuador.  Its natural habitat is subtropical or tropical moist montane forests.

References

oocarpa
Endemic flora of Ecuador
Trees of Ecuador
Data deficient plants
Taxonomy articles created by Polbot